VLW may refer to:

 Virtual legacy wires
 Visible Language Workshop
 Virginia Law Weekly
 Virginia Lawyers Weekly
 Voice of Libyan Women